Ahmet Doğu (born 26 November 1973) is a Turkish wrestler. He competed in the men's freestyle 97 kg at the 2000 Summer Olympics.

References

External links
 

1973 births
Living people
Turkish male sport wrestlers
Olympic wrestlers of Turkey
Wrestlers at the 2000 Summer Olympics
Place of birth missing (living people)
World Wrestling Championships medalists